Weber is a surname.

Weber may also refer to:

Places 
New Zealand 
 Weber, New Zealand, in the region of Hawkes Bay

United States
 Weber, Missouri
 Weber City, Virginia
 Weber County, Utah
 Weber River, Utah
 Weber, Wisconsin

Other
 Weber (crater), a lunar impact crater on the far side of the Moon

People
 Max Weber, a German sociologist

Other uses 
 Weber (journal), an American literary magazine
 Weber (unit) (Wb), SI derived unit of magnetic flux in electromagnetism
 Weber Inc., an American company, known for its line of barbecue grills, known as Weber Grills
 Weber Aircraft LLC, an American manufacturer of airline seats
 Weber carburetor is an Italian fuel system manufacturer, owned by Magneti Marelli
 Weber–Fechner law quantifies stimulus and perception
 Weber Piano Company, a New York City piano manufacturing company from 1852 through the 20th century
 Weber State University, Ogden, Utah
 Weber School, in Georgia
 Weber test is a medical test for hearing loss
 Webers, a hamburger restaurant in Orillia, Ontario, Canada
 Saint-Gobain Weber, a manufacturer of mortars, owned by Saint-Gobain

See also 
 South Weber, Utah
 Webber (surname), an English variant
 Webber (disambiguation)
 Weaver (disambiguation), an English variant
 Wever (disambiguation), a Dutch variant
 Justice Weber (disambiguation)